The following lists events that happened during 1991 in Laos.

Incumbents
President: Souphanouvong (until 15 August), Kaysone Phomvihane (starting 15 August)
Prime Minister: Kaysone Phomvihane (until 15 August), Khamtai Siphandon (starting 15 August)

Events

Births
2 June - Seng Athit Somvang, footballer

References

 
Years of the 20th century in Laos
Laos
1990s in Laos
Laos